This is a list of ambassadors of the United States to Albania. The ambassador is the head of the Embassy of the United States in Tirana.

History 

Albania had been under the domination of the Ottoman Empire since the 14th century, but gained a shaky independence in 1912 after an uprising against the Turks. After suffering invasions and occupations during the First and Second Balkan Wars and the Great War, Albania achieved a relatively stable degree of statehood.

The United States established diplomatic relations with Albania in 1922. President Harding appointed the first U.S. Minister to Albania, Ulysses Grant-Smith, who arrived in Tirana in December 1922. The first envoys to Albania had the rank of Minister.

Albania–United States relations were broken in 1939 upon the Italian invasion of Albania just prior to the start of World War II. Relations were not restored until the downfall of Communism in Europe in 1991.

Ambassadors

Notes

See also
Embassy of the United States, Tirana
Albania – United States relations
Foreign relations of Albania
Ambassadors of the United States

References
United States Department of State: Background notes on Albania

External links
 United States Department of State: Chiefs of Mission for Albania
 United States Department of State: Albania
 United States Embassy in Tirana

Albania
United States